University College London Boat Club (UCLBC) is a rowing club on the River Thames, based at Hartington Road, Chiswick.

The club is one of University College London's largest student societies, with over 100 formal members. The club is highly successful and has a rich heritage and has a stated annual goal of achieving a top 10 placement for each squad at the British Universities Rowing events including the Head of the River in March and the Regatta in May. It also aims to qualify as many crews as possible to race at the prestigious Henley Royal Regatta and Henley Women's Regatta.

The club currently trains under the coaching team of "Woody" Alan Sherman, James Skeels and Michael Tchouboroff with Tim Bailey as Director of Rowing. It accepts both experienced and novice oarsmen and women (providing they are current students at University College London). Teams train most of the time in the UCL gym on campus, and also at the University of London boathouse in Chiswick. The club also organises a number of social events and balls throughout the year.

There is an active alumni club, The Bentham Boat Club, which maintains an active involvement with the student rowers, providing valuable coaching and mentorship. Bentham field crews at all the major regattas and can also be found competing at European and World Masters Championships.

History

Early and Inter-war history of the Club
Founded in 1864, University College London Boat Club was not actually registered as a separate and distinct entity from the College itself until 1871.

It is believed that the club's first race was recorded on 24 May 1864 as a race between itself and Guy's RC. UCL does not appear in any rowing almanacs from around 1886 so it is believed that the sport may have enjoyed a brief period of popularity thanks to a number of enthusiasts at the College. The college begins to appear frequently in such almanacs from around 1921 and it is believed that this is the time at which the sport gained real popularity amongst the students. From around this time, UCL became one of the largest contributors to University of London Boat Club eights.

The club enjoyed the successes of many frequent Allom Cup wins throughout the 1930s. After this date there are very few open regatta or head wins listed under the club's name as it experienced a brief period of inactivity during the inter-war period.

First Henley appearance

University College London made its own debut at Henley Royal Regatta in 1933 when the College lost to Reading RC in the Thames Cup. Again the club raced in the 1950 Thames cup and lost but only after a fierce battle with Leeds University which was eventually lost by no more than a canvas. The report for this race reads as follows:

"UC&H started at 39, were not below 35 throughout and finished at 39. They led by ¼ length at the ¼ mile and by ½ length at the ½ mile. Leeds starting at 38 and settling to 33, closed up, took the lead after Fawley and had 1/3 length at the Mile"

Over the following few years rowing at UCL took a turn for the worse and contributions to University of London crews diminished significantly to the point at which only one or two 'University' men would make the cut each year. The club reported very few victories between 1950 and 1957 and only racked up one significant victory in the Walton Regatta. Furthermore, the club's ranking in the Tideway Head fell below 60th place; a dismal showing for one of the 'great' British university clubs. At the same time however University of London rowing experienced a period of renaissance which saw them post their first Henley win in the 1961 Thames Cup.

Modest signs of recovery in College rowing were apparent by 1962. In this year UCL crews rowed to 52 place in the Tideway head and in 1965 managed to post a result of 43rd in the same race. This period of recovery was short lived as just one year later the club dived to 198th place in the Head.

The club's golden age
With the arrival of Latymer Upper School's famed cox Jeff Easton at the College the club's fortunes really turned around. Jeff, who had coxed the school's grand eight and Prince Philip four went on to cox the College's 1972 first eight to victory in the novice division of the Men's Winter Eights. His experience with the Leander Club made him an excellent coach for the club.

In 1973 the club's ladies presented an impressive spectacle at the Ladies' henley Regatta. This Henley performance represented a major step up in standards and in 1975 the club rose to 19th in the Tideway Head, reaching the best position since 1953 despite competing against stronger opposition.

In 1975 having already beaten Leander Club a University College London eight went on to set a new Fawley Record of 3 min 18 sec against Potomac Boat Club of the United States in the semi-final of the Wyfold Cup. Despite ultimately winning, Potomac went on to lose the final.

In 1977, UCL's first and second eights finished 15th and 13th respectively in the Tideway Head; the club then went on to enter three crews in the 1978 Henley Royal Regatta. These were all significant achievements for the club and truly represented the peak of Easton's (now Dr Easton) successes.

1980s to the present
Starting from the early 1980s the club experienced a steep decline in its fortunes. By 1981 UCL had dropped to 113 in the Tideway Head and had failed to qualify for both the Ladies' and Visitors' Cups at Henley. From the early 1980s up until 1996 there were very few entries to Henley Regatta; in 1991 the club did not even manage to enter a crew in the Tideway head. This was again the case in 1994. UCLBC finally made a comeback to the world of elite competitive club rowing in 1995 when they finally re-qualified for the Temple Cup at Henley Royal Regatta which was lost in the first heat.

The club had since its foundation been known as the 'University College and Hospitals Boat Club' or UC&H, this was finally changed in 1988 to the more up to date and accurate 'University College London Boat Club'. The British Rowing club registration code for which is UCL.

The club's 1997 entry to Henley was slightly better though, with University College winning their first round heat of the Temple Cup by 1/3 length from Lady Margaret, but Harvard, a select crew, proved to be far too strong in the next round.

Since 1997 the club has experienced ups and downs but is now recognised throughout both London and the UK as a relatively successful club. 2008–09 saw the one of the most successful year for the club – both the Women's 4+ and the Men's 8+ qualified for Henley, with the men making it through to the Thursday after beating University of Reading "Easily". The Women's 8+ had a strong race at the Head, and the Men fielded 3 crews with the 1st 8 finishing 78th.

2011–12 was another good year for the club, particularly for the men's top boats. Starting with a top 12 finish in the international VIII's event Basel Head. Back in London, the club went on to dominate the intercollegiate Allom Cup, winning the cup itself (senior men's VIII's) and the senior and intermediate men's IV events. At The Head of the River Race 2012 the club finished 88th, a fairy good result considering several injuries within the squad. At Henley Royal Regatta, the club qualified for the Temple Challenge Cup and made it through to Thursday after beating Cambridge University Lightweight Rowing Club.

Future prospects of the club
In recent years the Club has expressed its desire to both expand membership of the Bentham Boat Club (UCL alumni rowing club) and build a new dedicated boat house somewhere on the Tideway which could provide a dedicated alternative to the current facilities used by the club at the University of London Boat Club's boathouse at Chiswick. UCL Boat Club aims to continue improving and rise to the top of the pile of both student rowing in London, and UCL sports clubs.

See also
Rowing on the River Thames
University of London Boat Club
University rowing (UK)
UCL Union

References

External links
University College London Boat Club
University College London Union

Tideway Rowing clubs
1864 establishments in England
Clubs and societies of University College London
Sports clubs established in 1864
University and college rowing clubs in the United Kingdom
Student sport in London